The 2009 Comerica Bank Challenger was a professional tennis tournament played on hard court. This was the twenty-second edition of the tournament which is part of the 2009 ATP Challenger Tour. It took place in Aptos, United States between 13 and 19 July 2009.

Singles entrants

Seeds

 Rankings are as of July 6, 2009.

Other entrants
The following players received wildcards into the singles main draw:
  Lester Cook
  Alex Kuznetsov
  Phillip Simmonds
  Brad Weston

The following players received entry from the qualifying draw:
  Nick Lindahl
  Tobias Kamke
  Yuichi Sugita
  Takao Suzuki

Champions

Singles

 Chris Guccione def.  Nick Lindahl, 6–3, 6–4

Doubles

 Carsten Ball /  Chris Guccione def.  Sanchai Ratiwatana /  Sonchat Ratiwatana, 6–3, 6–2

References
Official website
ITF Search 

Comerica Bank Challenger
Nordic Naturals Challenger
Nabisco